The Brown Bears men's basketball team is the basketball team that represents Brown University, located in Providence, Rhode Island. The school's team currently competes in the Ivy League.

Postseason results

NCAA tournament results
The Brown Bears have appeared in the NCAA Tournament two times, including the inaugural tournament in 1939. Their combined record is 0–2.

NIT results
The Brown Bears have appeared in the National Invitation Tournament (NIT) one time. Their record is 0–1.

CBI results
The Brown Bears have appeared in the College Basketball Invitational (CBI) two times. Their  combined record is 1–2.

CIT results
The Brown Bears have appeared in the CollegeInsider.com Postseason Tournament (CIT), one time. Their record is 0–1.

References

External links